Dalbergia miscolobium is a species of flowering plant in the family Fabaceae, native to seasonally dry tropical areas of Bolivia and Brazil. A slow-growing evergreen tree reaching , it is considered "very ornamental" due to its light, bluish-green leaves. It is used as a street tree in a number of Brazilian cities.

References

miscolobium
Ornamental trees
Flora of Bolivia
Flora of Brazil
Plants described in 1860